Amruthadhare is a 2005 Kannada-language film directed and co-produced by Nagathihalli Chandrashekhar and written by actor Ramesh Aravind. The film was released on 7 October 2005 starring Ramya and  Dhyan in the lead roles. The music was composed by Mano Murthy. Bollywood actor Amitabh Bachchan has made a guest appearance as himself in this movie. The film ran for twenty-five weeks, thereby becoming a silver jubilee film. The movie was dubbed in Telugu as Amrutha Varsham and included additional scenes with Jayasudha, Nassar, Dharmavarapu Subramanyam and Sunil.

Plot

Amrutha (Ramya) and Puru (Dhyan) are a married couple. However, they behave like lovers. Even though they like each other, they quarrel sometimes. Amrutha is a spendthrift and Dhyan is a miser. She wants a child to build a family, while he wants to build a house. The film follows their trials and tribulations as they navigate the difficult world of marriage in the modern age. The film also has a strong social message and speaks to the emptiness of a large home without a large family inside it.

Cast

 Ramya as Amritha
 Dhyan as Puru (Purandara)
 Ganesh as Gani, Puru's Co-worker
 Mandya Ramesh as Puru's Friend
 Yashwant Sardeshpande as Puru's Friend
 Bhavya as Amritha's mother
 Avinash as Puru's father
 Mandeep Roy
 Raju Ananthaswamy
 Amitabh Bachchan as Himself (Guest Appearance)

Music

The official soundtrack contains six songs. The music was composed by Mano Murthy and lyrics were by Nagathihalli Chandrashekhar.

Kannada version

Telugu version
 Adigga Adigga- Avi
 Priyatama Priyatama- Sam P. Keerthan, Srivardhini
 Illu Katti Choodu- Illu Katti Choodu
 Naatho Matladu- Amulya
 Ee Amrutha Varsham- VV.Prasanna, Abhi

Reception 
A critic from Rediff.com wrote that "Outwardly, the language of Amrithdhare is regional. But it communicates ideas on love, loyalty, marriage and companionship with such passion". A critic from Sify wrote that "On the whole, this neatly made family entertainer is good in parts and is a welcome change from action films".

Awards

Karnataka State Film Award for Third Best Film
Karnataka State Film Award for Best Female Playback Singer - Chaitra H. G. - "Huduga Huduga"
For Best Sound Recording - Johnson

References

External links 
 

2000s Kannada-language films
2005 films
Films scored by Mano Murthy
Films directed by Nagathihalli Chandrashekhar